These are the results for the mixed team event at the 2018 Summer Youth Olympics.

Results

References

 Results 

Diving at the 2018 Summer Youth Olympics